Guillermo Federico Gozálvez (born 5 March 2003) is an Argentine professional footballer who plays as a left winger for Colón.

Career
Gozálvez started his career at a young age with Sportivo Agua, before moving to Colón at the age of ten. He was promoted into the club's first-team squad seven years later in mid-2020, under the guidance of manager Eduardo Domínguez; he soon scored in a friendly with Atlético de Rafaela. After going unused on the substitute's bench for matches against Independiente, Atlético Tucumán and Talleres in the 2020 Copa de la Liga Profesional, Gozálvez made his senior debut during Colón's opener in the 2021 Copa de la Liga Profesional versus Central Córdoba on 13 February 2021; having replaced Federico Lértora late on.

Career statistics
.

Notes

References

External links

2003 births
Living people
Footballers from Santa Fe, Argentina
Argentine footballers
Association football midfielders
Argentine Primera División players
Club Atlético Colón footballers